George Frederick Percy Benson (11 January 1911 – 17 June 1983) was a British actor of both theatre and screen, whose career stretched from the 1930s to the early 1970s. He was on stage from the late 1920s, and made his film debut in 1932 in  Holiday Lovers written by Leslie Arliss. His most notable work as a comic actor included supporting roles with George Formby (Keep Fit - 1937) and Ronnie Barker (A Home of Your Own - 1964).

Early life
Benson was born in Cardiff and educated at Blundell's School, the son of Leslie Bernard Gilpin Benson and his wife Isita. The family moved to Weston-super-Mare around 1920 and to Bristol around 1925.  He began acting at school in the Latin plays mounted annually at the school. He trained for the stage at the Royal Academy of Dramatic Art (where he was the Silver Medallist in 1930).

Early career
Much of Benson's early work was in revue, particularly those mounted in the 1930s by Andre Charlot. In 1932-3 he toured Australia with the company of Athene Seyler and Nicholas Hannen and on the tour met Seyler's daughter, Jane Anne Sterndale Bennett, who would become his first wife. In 1936 he achieved his first real success, as Edward Gill in Herbert and Eleanor Farjeon's musical The Two Bouquets. He continued to work with Herbert Farjeon until he was called up for war service in 1940, appearing in the revues Nine Sharp and The Little Revue. He served with the Royal Artillery for six years, mostly in anti-aircraft units.

Later career
After the war, he played the part of the solicitor Desmond Curry in Terence Rattigan's The Winslow Boy on an extensive tour of the US (1947–1948), before returning to revue in the highly successful Lyric and Globe Revues. in 1955 he joined the Old Vic Company (with Robert Helpmann and Katharine Hepburn) on a tour of Australia, playing the clown roles in Measure for Measure, The Merchant of Venice and The Taming of the Shrew. During the late 1950s he cemented his reputation as skilled comedy actor in a succession of stage roles, perhaps notably that of Arthur Groomkirby in N. F. Simpson's 'Theatre of the Absurd' play One Way Pendulum.

Although still noted as a comedy actor, during the 1960s he showed he could also excel in darker and more serious roles. In 1961 he played the murderer Dr Crippen in Wolf Mankowitz's musical Belle, or the Ballad of Dr Crippen, and Boss Mangan in Bernard Shaw's Heartbreak House. In the early 1970s he appeared in several plays with Bernard Miles at the Mermaid Theatre, notably as the Inquisitor in St Joan. In 1973, while appearing as Polonius in Hamlet, he suffered a stroke which affected his speech and ended his career.

Personal life
He married, first, Jane Ann Sterndale Bennett, a granddaughter of the composer William Sterndale Bennett. They had two daughters, Caroline and Elizabeth. His second wife was Pamela Enid White, also (briefly) an actor. They had one son, Christopher. Benson took a keen interest in theatre history, and was Chairman of the Society for Theatre Research from 1968-72.

Filmography

Film

Television

Sources
Obituary of Mr George Benson, The Times, 21 June 1983 (pg. 12; Issue 61564; col G)

Who's Who in the Theatre, 16th edition, 1977

References

External links

https://theatricalia.com/person/pzp/george-benson

1911 births
1983 deaths
British male stage actors
British male film actors
British male television actors
People educated at Blundell's School
Alumni of RADA
20th-century British male actors
Male actors from Cardiff
British Army personnel of World War II
Royal Artillery personnel
Military personnel from Cardiff
Burials in Wales